Park Sung-kwang (born August 15, 1981) is a comedian, film director, and rapper in the band . He currently performs in KBS's Gag Concert, where he made his entertainment debut as a comedian in 2007. He owns a kimchi-business, and has done since 2012.
His previous talent agencies include Top Art Entertainment and SNS Entertainment. It had been reported in December 2017 that he was in talks with SM C&C for a new contract, which was successfully signed and SM C&C are now his current agency.

Education
Park graduated from Dong-ah Broadcasting College (동아방송대학), majoring in Film Arts.

Debut
Park debuted on Gag Concert in the skit, 'Concentrate on Debate' (집중토론) as the objector, in 2007. His other known skits include "Park VS Park", where he was the MC, and "Bongsunga School 2008" as Professor Ma and Park Ji-sun's boyfriend.
In 2011, he debuted as a director with his short film, "Curse", at the Seoul International Extreme-Short Image and Film Festival.

Filmography

Films

Television series

Variety shows

Discography

Brave Guys

Maheun Five - 마흔파이브
Park Sung-kwang, Heo Kyung-hwan, Kim Ji-ho, Kim Won-hyo, Park Young-jin

Awards and nominations

References

External links 
 

Living people
1981 births
South Korean comedians
People from Seoul
Gag Concert